The U.S. Ski and Snowboard Hall of Fame and Museum is located in Ishpeming, Michigan, the birthplace of organized skiing in the United States. Located in the state's Upper Peninsula, the building includes the hall of fame and museum, as well as a theater, library, gift shop, offices, and ample storage space for archive material and collections. The current building opened in 1992.

History

The National Ski Association, now known as U.S. Ski & Snowboard, was formed in Ishpeming in 1905, . It was formed during a meeting of ski clubs from Ishpeming, Minneapolis, Red Wing, Minnesota, and Eau Claire, Wisconsin. Ishpeming Ski Club founder Carl Tellefsen (1854−1908) was its first president, and for his contribution, he was among the first four to be accorded honored membership in the hall of fame in early 1957.

The Roland Palmedo Memorial Library, one of the largest research ski libraries in the United States is housed here. Roland Palmedo (1895−1977) was a ski-sport builder and contributor for more than 50 years. He helped to organize the National Ski Patrol, the teacher certification program, and various early ski teams and clubs. Palmedo also founded Mad River Glen ski area, edited two skiing books, and developed one of the most extensive ski libraries in America. Following his death, his family donated his library to the National Ski Hall of Fame and Museum where it has become the nucleus for the Roland Palmedo Memorial Library.

Notable members of the Hall of Fame

References

External links

Skiing History.org National Ski Hall of Fame: a detailed history

Ski museums and halls of fame
Ski
Sports museums in Michigan
Museums in Marquette County, Michigan
Awards established in 1954
Museums established in 1954
1954 establishments in Michigan
Skiing in Michigan